Calamine most commonly refers to calamine lotion.

Calamine also may refer to:

 Calamine, a pinkish powder used in calamine lotion
 Calamine (mineral), a historic name for an ore of zinc
 Calamine brass, an early method of making brass by reacting copper metal with calamine (zinc) ore
 Calamine, Arkansas, an unincorporated community in Sharp County, Arkansas
 Calamine, Wisconsin, an unincorporated community in Lafayette County, Wisconsin
 Calamine, a community and former railway terminus in north east Belgium near the mining community of Moresnet

See also
 Calamintha, a genus of plants
 La Calamine, a municipality in Belgium